Braddock Locks & Dam (previously named Monongahela Locks and Dam No. 2) is one of nine navigational structures on the Monongahela River between Pittsburgh, Pennsylvania and Fairmont, West Virginia.

Description
Braddock Locks and Dam consists of the locks located on the right bank and the newly gated dam, that replaced the nearly 100-year-old fixed-crest dam. The older structure in turn had replaced a lock and dam facility opened in 1841 at Port Perry, slightly upriver from Braddock.

Locks
Built in 1953, the locks consist of two  side-by-side chambers.

Dam
Construction of new Braddock Dam, started in 1999, was completed in May 2004 using innovative in-the-wet construction techniques. Two prefabricated hollow concrete segments were constructed at an off-site dry-dock and floated into place and set down on a prefabricated foundation system of sheet-pile cut-off walls and large diameter drilled shafts socketed into bedrock. The float-in segments were built with precast wall panels and cast-in-place bottom and top slabs.

The  spillway was equipped with three  by  Standard Tainter gates and one  by  Water Quality Tainter gate. Each gate is operated by two hydraulic cylinders. All gates were fabricated and assembled in one piece by G&G in Alabama and were barge shipped to the project site. Weight of the Standard Gate and the Water Quality Gate is 438 kips and 286 kips, respectively.

The construction cost of the new dam was approximately $107.4 million.

See also

 List of crossings of the Monongahela River

References

 Salamon J., Sehgal C., Karaffa W., "Large Width to Height Ration Tainter Gates at Braddock Lock and Dam", Waterpower 2006.

Bibliography 
 
 

Monongahela River
United States Army Corps of Engineers, Pittsburgh District
Dams in Pennsylvania
Water transportation in Pennsylvania
United States Army Corps of Engineers dams
Dams completed in 1906
1906 establishments in Pennsylvania